Constitutional review, or constitutionality review or constitutional control, is the evaluation, in some countries, of the constitutionality of the laws. It is supposed to be a system of preventing violation of the rights granted by the constitution, assuring its efficacy, their stability and preservation.

There are very specific cases in which the constitutional review differs from common law to civil law as well as judicial review in general.

Written and rigid constitutions exist in most countries, represent the supreme norm of the juridical order, and are on the top of the pyramid of norms. Also called fundamental law, supreme law, law of the laws, basic law, they have more difficult and formal procedures to updating them than other laws, which are sub-constitutional. The term "constitutional review" is usually characterized as a Civil Law concept, but some of the ideas behind it come from Common Law countries with written constitutions. For instance, the USA was the first country to adopt judicial review based directly on its constitution (see Marbury v. Madison), even though to this day the functions of the Constitutional Court and of the Court of the Last Resort are separated at neither Federal nor State level in the United States.

The judicial control of constitutionality applies to normative acts as well.

Control systems 
Depending on how each country decides to organize his constitutional reviews, it can be attributed to a different organ. In some countries, part of the review can be attribution of a political organ. For instance, In Brazil, the declaration of unconstitutionality in a concrete case by the Supreme Federal Court (STF) can be suggested to senate to give to this declaration global effects.

Bans on constitutional review 
Countries can put a ban on constitutional review.

Ban on constitutional review in the Netherlands 
The constitution of the Netherlands explicitly forbids courts to rule on the constitutionality of laws passed by parliament. Reason for banning constitutional review in the Netherlands is that it would put the judiciary in a legislative position, which conflicts with the idea of Separation of powers. Dutch parliament is responsible for adherence of laws it passes to the constitution. The Supreme Court of the Netherlands has ruled that this ban on constitutional review also extents to rulings on the creation of laws, rulings based on the Charter for the Kingdom of the Netherlands and general principles of law. The monist Constitution of the Netherlands does explicitly allow the review of laws by treaties that contain provisions binding all members. Consequently, treaties like the European Convention on Human Rights in practice have taken constitutional review-like effect.

See also
 Constitutional review in Germany
 Constitutional Review Commission (Tanzania)
 Judicial interpretation
 Judicial review
 List of constitutional courts
 Rule of law
 Rule According to Higher Law

References 

Judicial review